Ilya Sergeyevich Solaryov also known as Ilya Solarev (born August 2, 1982) is a Kazakhstani former professional ice hockey winger. He played for Barys Astana of the Kontinental Hockey League (KHL). He was selected by the Tampa Bay Lightning in the 9th round (281st overall) of the 2001 NHL Entry Draft.

Solaryov has played 119 regular season games and 14 playoff contests in the Kontinental Hockey League (KHL) with Barys Astana.

He participated at the 2010 IIHF World Championship as a member of the Kazakhstan men's national ice hockey team.

In September 2013, the International Ice Hockey Federation (IIHF) handed Solaryov a two-year ban following a positive test for Salbutamol. On December 5, 2013, he signed to play with the Danbury Whalers of the Federal Hockey League (FHL).

Career statistics

Regular season and playoffs

International

References

External links
 

1982 births
Living people
Barys Nur-Sultan players
Kazakhstani ice hockey right wingers
Kazakhstani people of Russian descent
Kazakhmys Satpaev players
Sportspeople from Perm, Russia
Tampa Bay Lightning draft picks
Yertis Pavlodar players
Asian Games gold medalists for Kazakhstan
Medalists at the 2011 Asian Winter Games
Asian Games medalists in ice hockey
Ice hockey players at the 2011 Asian Winter Games